Marc-Antoine Farry (born 3 July 1959) is a French professional golfer.

Farry was born in Paris, and started playing golf at the age of seven. He turned professional in 1979, and spent his early career as a teaching professional in Florida, United States.

Farry was a full member of the European Tour from 1989 to 2004. He has won 16 tournaments on the French domestic tour, including the 1985 and 2000 French PGA Championships, but has only one win to his name on the European Tour, the 1996 BMW International Open, which was reduced to 36 holes because of rain. His best finish on the European Tour Order of Merit was 49th in 1999.

Failed drug test
At the 2003 Open de France, the French Sports Ministry decided to conduct voluntary drug tests on some of the competitors. The top three at the end of the tournament, and another three players selected at random were tested. Farry was one of the names pulled out of the hat, along with Graeme McDowell and François Delamontagne, with Philip Golding, David Howell and Peter O'Malley also being tested as the leading finishers. While the other five provided negative tests, Farry's came back positive for prednisolone, an anti-inflammatory. It was the first positive drug test recorded on the European Tour, and reported as possibly the first by any professional golfer.

Since Farry had been prescribed the drug by his doctor as treatment for a wrist injury, and the golfing authorities had yet to formulate an anti-drugs policy, his result in the tournament was allowed to stand and no further action was taken.

Professional wins (19)

European Tour wins (1)

*Note: The 1996 BMW International Open was shortened to 36 holes due to heavy rain.

Other wins (16)
16 wins on French domestic tour including:
1985 French PGA Championship
2000 French PGA Championship

European Senior Tour wins (2)

European Senior Tour playoff record (0–1)

Results in major championships

Note: Farry only played in The Open Championship.

CUT = missed the half-way cut

Team appearances
Amateur
European Amateur Team Championship (representing France): 1977
European Youths' Team Championship (representing France): 1978, 1979 (winners)

Professional
World Cup (representing France): 1987, 1991, 1993, 1996, 1997, 1999
Alfred Dunhill Cup (representing France): 1990, 1992, 1997, 1999
Europcar Cup (representing France): 1985 (winners)

References

External links

French male golfers
European Tour golfers
European Senior Tour golfers
PGA Tour Champions golfers
Golfers from Paris
Sportspeople from Oise
1959 births
Living people